Andrey Atuchin (born September 10, 1980) is a Russian paleoartist, illustrator and biologist who focuses on artistic reconstructions of extinct animals. He is known for his clean, detailed style reminiscent of classic National Geographic illustrations. Atuchin has collaborated with paleontologists all over the world in illustrating new species for papers and press releases, such as the 2014 feathered dinosaur Kulindadromeus zabaikalicus, as well as more recent discoveries including the pliosaur Luskhan itilensis, described in 2017, and the 2018 ankylosaur dinosaur Akainacephalus johnsoni.

Publications

References

External links

Living people
1980 births
Paleoartists
Scientific illustrators
Kemerovo State University alumni